Grovetown High School is located in Grovetown, Georgia, United States, in Columbia County, and opened on August 10, 2009. Its enrollment for the 2010-2011 school was approximately 1300 students; its most recent enrollment approached 2,100.

Academics
In 2014, Grovetown was ranked as a 2014 Most Challenging High School by The Washington Post. In 2014 the school was recognized for its success with its Advanced Placement Program, receiving recognition as an AP Access & Support School, an AP Stem School, and an AP Stem Achievement School. Grovetown offers a large variety of academic classes to take, and many different career class options. In the 2018, season, the Warrior football won their region championship in a game against Evans high school.

Athletics
The soccer team were region champions in 2011, making it to the elite 8 in the state playoff, ultimately losing to Woodward Academy the eventual State champions . The wrestling team were the Columbia County champions in 20132014. The volleyball team were the 2010, 2011, 2014, and 2015 region champs. In the 20162017 school year, all sports teams won a region championship. During the 20172018 school year a girls lacrosse team was started. During the 20212022 school year, the boys' basketball team became state champions, Grovetown's first ever. The soccer team also became region champions.

Speech and Debate Team
The Grovetown High School Debate Team began in 2011. It competes in Lincoln-Douglas, Public Forum, and Policy Debate, as well as some individual events, including Extemporaneous, Impromptu and Prose/Poetry.

In 2011 it won runner-up to the state champion in the novice division of Lincoln-Douglas at the GFCA's 1st and 2nd Year State Championship.

In its third year, the team qualified 24 members to the GFCA Varsity State Championship, held at Stratford Academy. At the Varsity State Tournament, the team took the Championship in Lincoln Douglas Debate. Overall the team placed third in debate divisions. At the tournament the team's coach was recognized as the 2014 GFCA Speech Coach of the Year. It also qualified seven students to the National Speech and Debate Association Tournament in Public Forum, Lincoln-Douglas, Extemporaneous Speaking, and Congressional Debate.

The Debate team is affiliated with both the National Speech and Debate Association and the Georgia Forensic Coaches Association.

Extra-curricular activates

Honors societies 
Grovetown High School currently has 11 honors societies. A National honors society chapter, Mu Alpha Theta Chapter, Thespian society, National Art society chapter, Rho Kappa chapter, Science National Honors Society chapter, Tri-M Chapter, French Honors chapter, Spanish Honors Chapter, Delta Phi Alpha chapter, and an English Honors society chapter.

Grovetown Band Of Warriors 
Grovetown offers numerous instrumentation music opportunities. Numerous large group concert bands are offered, a concert band, symphonic, and top group known as Warrior Winds are the school's main band classes. Grovetown also offers a percussion class and beginning band for those wanting to pick up an instrument. All groups consistently earn Superior ratings at LGPE performances, and also perform around the county for audiences. 

Grovetown also has a marching band that serves more than 100 student a year. The group earns superior ratings at competitions, and also hosts Columbia County's only marching competition known as the Warrior invitational where bands come from all over the state annually. The marching band also performs in the Grovetown Christmas parade, outside of local activities, the band has performed parades in Walt Disney World and Macy's Thanksgiving Day Parade.

.

References

External links 

Columbia County Board of Education

High schools in Columbia County, Georgia
Public high schools in Georgia (U.S. state)
High School
Educational institutions established in 2009
2009 establishments in Georgia (U.S. state)